Tai Wai is one of the 41 constituencies of the Sha Tin District Council. The seat elects one member of the council every four years. It was first created in 1985 Hong Kong district boards election. The constituency boundary is loosely based on Tai Wai.

Councillors represented

1985 to 1991

1991 to present

Election results

2010s

2000s

1990s

1980s

Citations

References
2011 District Council Election Results (Sha Tin)
2007 District Council Election Results (Sha Tin)
2003 District Council Election Results (Sha Tin)

Constituencies of Hong Kong
Constituencies of Sha Tin District Council
1985 establishments in Hong Kong
Constituencies established in 1985
Tai Wai